Galaxy of Terror is a 1981 science fiction horror film produced by Roger Corman through New World Pictures and directed by Bruce D. Clark. It was distributed by United Artists.  It stars Edward Albert, Erin Moran, Ray Walston and Taaffe O'Connell.

Plot
On the desolate, storm-lashed planet  Morganthus, the last survivor of a crashed spaceship is attacked and killed by an invisible undead crew member. A very long distance away, on the Earth-like world Xerxes, two figures play a strange game. One, an old woman named Mitri, controls the game while the other, a male, is the Planet Master, an all-powerful mystic. The Master instructs Ilvar, one of his military commanders to go on a rescue mission to Morganthus for the previous ship.

Without delay, the spaceship Quest blasts off to Morganthus, piloted by Captain Trantor, a survivor of a famous space disaster that has left her psychologically scarred and unstable. As the Quest approaches the planet's atmosphere, it suddenly veers out of control; the captain plunges toward the surface and makes a survivable landing. After recovering from the crash, the crew leaves the Quest in search for survivors. Among them is Alluma, a psi-sensitive woman. She and other crewmen have problems with pushy and arrogant team leader Baelon.

Crossing the landscape of the planet, they reach the other vessel and find several victims, making them think that a massacre has taken place. The team disposes of all of the bodies except one which they take back for analysis. Cos, the highly-strung youngest member of the team, becomes increasingly terrified of being on the ship. This is the first clue that it is the fear of the individual crew members that are manifesting to kill them. A short time later, he is killed by a grotesque creature that immediately vanishes.

The crew discover that something from the planet pulled them down and, in order to escape, they must investigate. While exploring the planet, they discover a massive pyramid-shaped structure, which Alluma describes as "empty" and "dead". They find an opening at the top of the pyramid and use a rope to slide Ilvar in; Ilvar is attacked by tentacles that drain his blood. They find an alternate entrance, though Quuhod breaks his crystal throwing stars and remains by the entrance. The throwing stars reform; when Quuhod picks one up, a piece breaks off and begins sliding through his skin, forcing him to sever his arm. However, his arm uses the remaining throwing star to impale him.

While searching through the pyramid, Dameia discovers Quuhod's severed arm being eaten by maggots. One maggot grows to giant size and proceeds to sexually assault and kill Dameia. Back on the ship, Ranger catches sight of Captain Trantor running as if being attacked. Soon, Trantor spontaneously combusts as she fires a weapon in an airlock. Ranger races to save her, to no avail. After discovering Dameia's corpse, the other surviving crew head back to the ship.

On the Quest, the ship's cook join the remaining survivors. The crew return to the pyramid. There, Baelon elects to stay behind and is torn apart by a monster. Meanwhile, inside the pyramid, Alluma, Ranger, and Cabren are separated by moving walls. Ranger begins to feel the terror effect, and is soon attacked by a double. He manages to fend the double off, regains control of himself while doing so, and the double fades away. Alluma is attacked by tentacles which crush her head. Rangers finds Cabren, the other remaining survivor, and tells him. Deep inside the pyramid, Cabren discovers that Kore is really the Master, who has been masquerading as Kore on board the Quest. He tells Cabren that he has "won the game." The pyramid turns out to be an ancient toy for the children of a long-extinct race, built to test their ability to control fear. Cabren is then forced to confront the creatures which the crew were attacked and also zombified versions of the dead crew, all of which he kills. Cabren states that he will not play this game, and will simply leave the planet. Kore's dying words express doubt that Cabren will be able to change his fate. Angered, Cabren kills the Master's previous host body. However, the Master cannot die, and Cabren becomes his new host.

Cast
 Edward Albert as Cabren, an experienced and cool-headed space veteran who is the film's main protagonist
 Erin Moran as Alluma, the ship's empath
 Ray Walston as Kore, the ship's cook
 Taaffe O'Connell as Dameia, the ship's technical officer
 Bernard Behrens as Commander Ilvar, the overall commander of the mission
 Zalman King as Baelon, the rescue unit's team leader
 Robert Englund as Ranger, the ship's second technical officer
 Sid Haig as Quuhod, crewman and crystal shuriken thrower
 Grace Zabriskie as Captain Trantor, the ship's troubled captain
Jack Blessing as Cos, an inexperienced, frightened crewman

Production

James Cameron
While known as a "B movie king", Roger Corman has started the careers of many prominent Hollywood people with his films. Galaxy of Terror was one of the earliest films to feature the work of James Cameron, who served as Production Designer and Second Unit Director on the film. It was the second Corman film on which Cameron worked as a crewman, the first being Battle Beyond the Stars (1980). Working on a tight budget, Cameron's innovative filmmaking techniques came to the forefront. In one scene, Cameron was able to figure out a way to get maggots to wiggle on cue by developing a metal plate onto which the maggots were placed, then ran an electric current through the plate whenever filming began, causing the maggots to move energetically about. His ability to find low-tech solutions to such problems reportedly made him a favorite of Corman and eventually allowed him to pursue more ambitious projects. Ridley Scott's Alien (1979) was an important inspiration for Galaxy of Terror and Cameron would later direct the sequel, Aliens (1986). Optical FX Supervisor Tony Randel, who worked with Cameron on Galaxy of Terror, commented on the Shout! Factory DVD release that Aliens looks like Galaxy of Terror in many ways.

Taaffe O'Connell and "the worm scene" 
The commentary on the 2010 Shout! Factory DVD release includes R.J. Kizer, one of three editors of the film. Kizer reveals that the originally scripted version of O'Connell's "Dameia" character would see her die topless while being stripped and consumed by a monster. Producer Roger Corman, however, had promised financial backers of the movie a sex scene involving O'Connell. The re-write included full nudity and far more explicit sexual content, including simulated sexual intercourse during which Dameia, lying underneath the giant worm and covered in excreted slime, can be seen and heard reacting first with terror, then forced sexual arousal, to the monster raping her. Helpless and betrayed by her own mind and body, Dameia perishes as she's driven to a fatally intense orgasm.

After informing director Clark and actress O'Connell about the changes and having both of them balk, Corman decided to direct the entire scene himself. He hired a body double for O'Connell to shoot the full-nudity sequences, parts of which made the final cut, even though it is still O'Connell in front of the camera for almost the entire sequence. The completed film was submitted to the Motion Picture Association of America film rating system (MPAA) for review. The sexual content of this scene was considered graphic enough by their standards that it was initially given an X rating, a rating which existed at that time that was used with films containing content (usually sexual) for adults only.

Kizer then made some small cuts to avoid the X rating. In the commentary, he states that the cuts were of two types. The first type involved brief shots of O'Connell's face expressing "rhapsodic and ecstatic" looks that too obviously indicated forced sexual arousal. The second type showed lewd "humping" motions by the giant maggot that too realistically simulated sexual intercourse occurring with the nude Dameia ensnared underneath. None of the cuts were longer than one second in length and none altered the sequence of the scene. However, they were enough to avoid the film receiving an X rating. The final released scene in film and VHS versions still contain segments of both kinds of shots, indicating that the cuts were probably made at either end of those sequences. Several countries still found this too explicit and either required the scene to be deleted entirely or denied the film a theatrical release. All later authorized VHS/DVD/Blu-ray/Steelbook releases of the film in Europe, America and elsewhere contain the scene as it was released in its final, R-rated version. The X rated clipped materials themselves were lost over time and are not included in any release. The scene can be seen again, in part, during the opening credits of a later Corman produced film, the 1988 remake of Not of This Earth directed by Jim Wynorski and starring Traci Lords. The scene has nothing to do with the content of that film, but is part of a montage from earlier Corman films shown during the opening credits. The audio in this version of the scene is done by another, uncredited actress.

The scene is discussed on the commentary of the Blu-ray Disc release more than any other aspect of the film. Clark, the director, admits that Corman's insertion of the scene, which Clark adamantly opposed, is what ultimately made the film a commercial success. Corman, in an older interview, states that the character of Dameia as re-written had a fear of sex as well as a fear of worms. O'Connell, in a separate interview with Femme Fatales magazine, interpreted that Dameia was frightened by her own sexual desire to completely submit to someone or something powerful, which the phallic, tentacled monster lethally provides. O'Connell also relates in the commentary how physically challenging the scene was and how the maggot prop made for the film, which weighed in at over a ton, almost collapsed on top of her at one point, which could have potentially killed her.

Release
The film was originally released on VHS and Laserdisc by Nelson Entertainment. Up until 2010, Galaxy of Terror did not have an authorized region 1 (North America) DVD release. There was a remastered and authorized Region 2 (Europe) Italian disc available from Mondo Home Entertainment released in 2006 which is now out-of-print. The lack of authorized discs for so many years has led to numerous unauthorized copies of the movie being sold online and elsewhere.

On July 20, 2010, Shout! Factory released Galaxy of Terror on Region 1 DVD and, for the first time, on Blu-ray Disc. The release also contains cast interviews and behind-the-scenes information on a variety of aspects.

The film was released in Germany in a dual Blu-ray and DVD uncut 2-disc Limited Edition mediabook from BMV-Medien Entertainment on April 19, 2012. The film was also released in Japan on Blu-ray from Stingray distribution on September 27, 2013 and contains the original English language version and a Japanese dubbed version both in Mono DTS-HD Master Audio and also includes Japanese subtitles.

Reception and legacy
On Rotten Tomatoes  it has an approval rating of 31% based on 13 reviews, with an average rating of 3.9/10. On Metacritic the film has a score of 38% based on reviews from 5 critics, indicating "Generally unfavorable reviews". Galaxy of Terror has typically been reviewed as one of a number of Alien (1979) rip-offs that appeared in the early 1980s, but it has also been credited with itself influencing later, more mainstream films such as Aliens (1986). There is a direct connection between Galaxy of Terror and Aliens in that the latter was directed by James Cameron. The success of Aliens, which shares Galaxy of Terror's grim and dark visual aesthetic (completed with a much greater budget) has in turn influenced a variety of later films. Another mainstream sci-fi/horror film that seems to have borrowed directly from Galaxy of Terror's plot line of astronauts facing base fears is Event Horizon (1997).

See also
Journey to the Seventh Planet

References

External links
 
 
 

1981 films
1981 horror films
1980s English-language films
1980s monster movies
1980s science fiction horror films
American monster movies
American science fiction horror films
American space adventure films
Films directed by Bruce D. Clark
Films produced by Roger Corman
Films set on fictional planets
Films about extraterrestrial life
Films about rape
New World Pictures films
United Artists films
1980s American films